Mordellistena gracilipes is a beetle in the genus Mordellistena of the family Mordellidae. It was described in 1931 by Maurice Pic.

References

gracilipes
Beetles described in 1931